Local elections were held for South Ribble Borough Council on 3 May 2007.  Elections are held every four years with all councillors up for election in multi-member electoral wards.

See also
South Ribble

References
 South Ribble Council (pdf)

2007 English local elections
2007
2000s in Lancashire